In the lateral part of the jugular fossa of the temporal bone is the mastoid canaliculus for the entrance of the auricular branch of the vagus nerve.

Additional images

References

External links
 

Foramina of the skull